Cabela's Outdoor Adventures may refer to:

Cabela's Outdoor Adventures (2005 video game), a 2005 video game
Cabela's Outdoor Adventures (2009 video game), a 2009 video game